Lilla Jönssonligan på kollo is the third film in the Swedish Lilla Jönssonligan film series. It was released on January 23, 2004, in Sweden and was directed by Christjan Wegner.

The film was broadcast on the Swedish television channel TV4 on December 29, 2007.

Cast
Conrad Cronheim - Charles-Ingvar "Sickan" Jönsson
Buster Söderström - Ragnar Vanheden
Anton Pettersson - Harry Kruth
Maja Dosthe - Doris
Max Holmstrand - Junior
Loa Falkman - Wall-Enberg
Pia Johansson - Lawyer Gabrielsson
Leif Andrée - Professor Rixil
Cecilia Ljung - Miss Rask
Tommy Andersson - Miss Fridh
Roddy Benjaminson - Loket
Sten Ljunggren - Groundkeeper in the school
Magnus Eriksson - Principal
Allan Nilsson - Captain on the Gotland boat
Hampus Andersson - Biffen 
Lukas Benjaminsson - Junior's friend
Wilhelm Fredriksson - Junior's friend
Hans Mosesson - Stig
Paul Tilly - Ulf Karlsson

References

External links

2004 films
Swedish children's films
Jönssonligan films
Swedish comedy films
Films set in the 1950s
Films set in Gotland
2000s Swedish-language films
2000s Swedish films